Chiridopsis is a genus of leaf beetles belonging to the family Chrysomelidae.

Selected species
 Chiridopsis atricollis Borowiec, 2005
 Chiridopsis aubei (Boheman, 1855)
 Chiridopsis bipunctata 
 Chiridopsis boutereli Spaeth, 1917
 Chiridopsis defecta Medvedev & Eroshkina, 1988
 Chiridopsis ghatei Borowiec & Swietojanska, 2000
 Chiridopsis levis Borowiec, 2005
 Chiridopsis maculata Borowiec, 2005
 Chiridopsis marginepunctata Borowiec, 2005
 Chiridopsis nigropunctata Borowiec & Ghate, 1999
 Chiridopsis nigroreticulata Borowiec, 2005
 Chiridopsis nigrosepta (Fairmaire, 1891)
 Chiridopsis punctata  (Weber, 1801
 Chiridopsis rubromaculata Borowiec, Ranade, Rane & Ghate, 2001
 Chiridopsis spadix Spaeth, 1917

References

Chrysomelidae genera
Cassidinae